John Tyake was Archdeacon of Barnstaple from 1515 to 1518.

References

Archdeacons of Barnstaple
16th-century English people